Lawrence Richardson Jr. (December 2, 1920 in Altoona, Pennsylvania – July 21, 2013 in Durham, North Carolina) was an American Classicist and ancient historian educated at Yale University who was a member of the faculty of classics at Duke University from 1966 to 1991. He was married to the Classical archaeologist Emeline Hill Richardson. Richardson received numerous fellowships, including a Fulbright, a Guggenheim, and support from the American Council of Learned Societies. He was a Fellow of the American Academy in Rome (1950) and field director of the AAR's Cosa excavations (1952–1955). He was a Resident of the American Academy in Rome (1979), and served as the American Academy in Rome’s Mellon Professor-in-Charge of the School of Classical Studies (1981). In 2012 he was awarded the Gold Medal of the Archaeological Institute of America.

Richardson's research included interests in Roman domestic architecture, the sites of Pompeii and Cosa, and Roman wall painting.

Publications

Theses
 1944. Poetical theory in republican Rome; an analytical discussion of the shorter narrative hexameter poems written in Latin during the first century before Christ. Undergraduate prize essays: Yale university, vol. v. New Haven, Yale University Press; London, H. Milford, Oxford University Press.

Books
 1977. Propertius: Elegies I-IV : Ed., with introd. and commentary. Norman OK: University of Oklahoma Press. .
1988. Pompeii: an architectural history. Baltimore: Johns Hopkins University Press. .
1992. A new topographical dictionary of ancient Rome. Baltimore: Johns Hopkins University Press. .
 1993. F. E. Brown, E. H. Richardson, L. Richardson, Jr. Cosa III: The Buildings of the Forum. Colony, Municipium, and Village. (Memoirs of the American Academy in Rome, 37.) Pennsylvania State University Press.
 1998. [Festschrift] L. Richardson Jr., M. T. Boatwright, and H. B. Evans. The shapes of city life in Rome and Pompeii : essays in honor of Lawrence Richardson, Jr. on the occasion of his retirement. New Rochelle, N.Y. : A.D. Caratzas. .
 2000. A catalog of identifiable figure painters of ancient Pompeii, Herculaneum, and Stabiae. Baltimore: Johns Hopkins University Press.

Articles
 1957. "Cosa and Rome: Comitium and Curia." Archaeology 10.1:49-55.

Ph. D. Students
 James L. Franklin. 1975. The Chronology and Sequence of the Candidacies for Municipal Magistracies Attested by the Pompeian Parietal Inscriptions, A.D. 71-79. Ph.D. thesis, Duke University.

Necrology
"Lawrence Richardson, Jr., FAAR'50, RAAR'79" American Academy in Rome Society of Fellows 
The News & Observer on July 25, 2013

External links

References

1920 births
2013 deaths
American historians
Duke University faculty
Yale University alumni
American classical scholars
Classical archaeologists